Juan Torres de Osorio (1562–1632) was a Roman Catholic prelate who served as Bishop of Valladolid (1627–1632), Bishop of Oviedo (1624–1627), Bishop of Catania (1619–1624), and Bishop of Siracusa (1613–1619).

Biography
Juan Torres de Osorio was born in Cuéllar, Spain on 16 January 1562. On 13 November 1613, he was appointed during the papacy of Pope Paul V as Bishop of Siracusa. On 24 November 1613, he was consecrated bishop by Paolo Emilio Sfondrati, Cardinal-Bishop of Albano, with Antonio d'Aquino, Bishop of Sarno, and Domingo de Oña, Bishop of Gaeta, serving as co-consecrators.  On 19 October 1619, he was appointed during the papacy of Pope Paul V as Bishop of Catania. On 22 April 1624, he was selected as Bishop of Oviedo and confirmed by Pope Urban VIII on 29 May 1624. On 7 March 1627, he was selected as Bishop of Valladolid and confirmed by Pope Urban VIII on 19 July 1627. He served as Bishop of Valladolid until his death on 23 September 1632.

While bishop, Osorio was the principal co-consecrator of Justino Antolínez Burgos, Bishop of Tortosa (1627).

References

External links and additional sources
 (for Chronology of Bishops) 
 (for Chronology of Bishops)  
 (for Chronology of Bishops) 
 (for Chronology of Bishops) 
 (for Chronology of Bishops) 
 (for Chronology of Bishops) 
 (for Chronology of Bishops) 
 (for Chronology of Bishops) 

17th-century Roman Catholic bishops in Spain
Bishops appointed by Pope Paul V
Bishops appointed by Pope Urban VIII
1562 births
1632 deaths
17th-century Roman Catholic bishops in Sicily